33 Arietis (abbreviated 33 Ari) is a binary star in the northern constellation of Aries. 33 Arietis is the Flamsteed designation. The combined apparent magnitude of 5.33 is bright enough to be seen with the naked eye.

The primary component is an A-type main sequence star with a magnitude of 5.40 and a stellar classification of A3 V. It has a magnitude 8.40 companion at an angular separation of 28.6 arcseconds. An excess of infrared emission suggests the presence of circumstellar dust in this system. In the 24μm band, this debris disk has a mean temperature of 815 K, which puts it at a radius of 0.85 astronomical units (AU) from the primary star. Excess emission appears in the 70μm band, which has a temperature of 103 K and a radius out to 42 AU.

References

External links
Aladin previewer
Aladin sky atlas
 HR 782
 CCDM J02407+2704

016628
Binary stars
012489
Arietis, 33
Aries (constellation)
A-type main-sequence stars
0782
Durchmusterung objects